is a Japanese swimmer who won a bronze medal in the 200 m breaststroke at the 2005 World Aquatics Championships. He finished 11th in the same event at the 2004 Summer Olympics.

Biography
Imamura was named after the main character of the sports manga Ganbare Genki. At first, he competed in baseball, and only in high school started seriously training in swimming. In 2004, at the national championships he finished second after Kosuke Kitajima in the 200 m breaststroke. He thus qualified for the 2004 Olympics, but did not reach the finals. His peak came in 2005 when he won the national title in 200 m breaststroke, beating Kitajima, and finished second in the 100 m breaststroke. He then won a bronze medal at the World Championships, a bronze medal at the Universiade, and three medals at the 2005 East Asian Games.

References

1982 births
Living people
People from Tomisato
Swimmers at the 2004 Summer Olympics
Tokai University alumni
Olympic swimmers of Japan
Japanese male breaststroke swimmers
World Aquatics Championships medalists in swimming
Universiade medalists in swimming
Universiade bronze medalists for Japan
Medalists at the 2005 Summer Universiade
21st-century Japanese people